The Stade Bollaert-Delelis is the main football stadium in Lens, France, that was built in 1933. It is the home of RC Lens. The stadium's capacity is 38,223 – about 7,000 more than the city's population. The stadium was originally named after Félix Bollaert, a director of Compagnie des Mines de Lens, who was anxious to promote the development of sports clubs in the city. Construction began in 1931, though Bollaert died shortly before the stadium's inauguration. It was renamed Stade Bollaert-Delelis in 2012 after the death of André Delelis, former mayor of the city and politician who served as the Minister of Commerce under President François Mitterrand.

History
The stadium has hosted matches in the following major international tournaments:

1984 European Championship
1998 FIFA World Cup
1999 Rugby World Cup
2007 Rugby World Cup
2016 European Championship

Architecture

The stadium is constructed in the English style with four separate stands dedicated respectively to:

Henri Trannin, native of Bully-les-Mines, Goalkeeper at the club for 18 years, sports director for Lens from 1952 to 1956, passing away in July 1974; it was dedicated on 4 December 1976
Tony Marek, former player and coach, international in the 1950s (lower part) and Xercès Louis, former player, first French international player from the Antilles (upper part);    
Élie Delacourt, former fans' group president;
Max Lepagnot, former president of the district of Artois.

Until 15 September 2018, all parts of the stadium contained seating. However, most supporters in the Marek, being a side stand, used to keep standing during the games as it is considered the kop and are considered as the most fervent supporters in the stadium, which makes the stadium different from most of the other stadiums, as the most fervent fans tend to usually sit behind the nets. Since 15 September 2018, the Marek contains a standing area again, as well as the lower parts of the Trannin and Delacourt stands since the start of the 2022–2023 season. The stadium's capacity is now 38,223.

Events

UEFA Euro 1984

1998 FIFA World Cup
The stadium was one of the venues of the 1998 FIFA World Cup, and held the following matches:

1999 Rugby World Cup

2007 Rugby World Cup

UEFA Euro 2016
In May 2011, the stadium was designated to host the 2016 European Football Championship. To be renovated, the stadium was closed during the 2014-2015 season.

Other uses
The France national team has played eight matches at the stadium without defeat. Lille played two UEFA Champions League campaigns there when their own stadium was deemed inadequate, in (2001–02 and 2006–07). It hosted the Johnny Hallyday concert in 2009 and a Jehovah's Witnesses gathering in 2006, which created controversy. The stadium is the setting for a scene in the movie Bienvenue chez les Ch'tis, shot during a match between Lens and Nice in April 2007. We hear "Les corons" sung by the public at the end of halftime break.

In 2012 the Stadium held a rugby League match between France and Wales as part of an Autumn International Series match. 11,278 fans came to watch the game.

References

External links

Stade Félix-Bollaert on www.sitercl.com

Lens, Pas-de-Calais
RC Lens
Football venues in France
1998 FIFA World Cup stadiums
UEFA Euro 2016 stadiums
Rugby World Cup stadiums
Rugby union stadiums in France
Sports venues in Pas-de-Calais
Multi-purpose stadiums in France
UEFA Euro 1984 stadiums
Sports venues completed in 1933
1933 establishments in France